The 1985 Kantalai massacre refers to the torture and subsequent murder of 6 Sri Lankan Tamils by the Sri Lankan military.

Murder of family
On 9 November 1985, soldiers belonging to the Sri Lankan military went to the home of Mayilvakanam near a Hindu temple, Kantalai Pillayar Kovil. The military then abducted all 6 members of the house. Later their bodies were found in 4th Mile post area in Allai road. Among the bodies, were two daughters of Mayilvakanam. Postmortem revealed that the two girls were raped before being killed.

Sources
THE NORTHEAST SECRETARIAT ON HUMAN RIGHTS (NESOHR). Massacres of Tamils (1956-2008)p. 14–15. Chennai: Manitham Publishers, 2009. 
Barnett R. Rubin. Cycles of Violence: Human Rights in Sri Lanka Since the Indo-Sri Lanka Agreement p. 33.

1985 crimes in Sri Lanka
Attacks on civilians attributed to the Sri Lanka Army
Massacres in Sri Lanka
Massacres in 1985
Mass murder of Sri Lankan Tamils
Sri Lankan government forces attacks in the Sri Lankan Civil War
Terrorist incidents in Sri Lanka in 1985